Memorandum is a one-hour 1965 documentary co-directed by Donald Brittain and John Spotton, and produced by John Kemeny for the National Film Board of Canada. It follows Bernard Laufer, a Jewish Holocaust survivor, on an emotional pilgrimage back to the Bergen-Belsen concentration camp. Considered by many critics to be Brittain's finest work, the film's title refers to Hitler's memorandum about the "final solution."

A detailed analysis of the film's structure is available in Ken Dancyger's The Technique of Film and Video Editing: History, Theory and Practice.

Awards
 Venice Film Festival, Venice: First Prize, Lion of St. Mark, 1966
 Golden Gate International Film Festival, San Francisco: First Prize, Essay, 1966
 Vancouver International Film Festival, Vancouver: Certificate of Merit, Television Films, 1966
 Montreal International Film Festival, Montreal: Special Mention, Medium-Length Films, 1966

References

External links
Watch Memorandum at NFB.ca

Bergen-Belsen concentration camp
1965 films
Films directed by Donald Brittain
National Film Board of Canada documentaries
English-language Canadian films
Black-and-white documentary films
Documentary films about the Holocaust
1965 documentary films
Canadian black-and-white films
Films produced by John Kemeny
1960s English-language films
1960s Canadian films